The Sabail FK 2021–22 season was Sabail's fifth Azerbaijan Premier League season, and their sixth season in existence. They will compete in the Premier League and the Azerbaijan Cup.

Season events
On 22 June, Shahriyar Rahimov signed for Sabail from Zira.

On 2 July, Mahammad Mirzabeyov signed for Sabail from Sabah.

On 9 July, Jabir Amirli signed for Sabail from Neftçi.

On 15 July, Javid Taghiyev signed for Sabail from Sabah.

On 29 July, Domantas Šimkus signed for Sabail from Hapoel Kfar Saba.

On 7 August, Jurgen Goxha signed for Sabail from Gabala. Two days later, 9 August, Elmir Tagiyev signed for Sabail from Turan-Tovuz.

On 11 August, Sabail announced the signings of Orkhan Farajov from Keşla and Jamal Arago from Drita, whilst Ruslan Hajiyev re-joined the club on another season-long loan deal from Qarabağ.

On 19 August, Sabail announced the season-long loan signing of Elton Alibeyli from Neftçi.

On 6 September, Sabail announced the signing of Nicolas Rajsel to a one-year contract.

On 7 January, Elshan Abdullayev was released, and Elton Alibeyli return to Neftçi after his loan deal was ended early.

On 11 January, Kamran Agayev announced his retirement from football.

On 21 January, Sabail extended their contract with Turan Manafov for an additional year, before loaning him to Olympiacos Volos until the end of the season.

On 4 February, Sabail announced the loan signing of Rashad Azizli from Zira until the end of the season, with Huseynali Guliyev joining from Sumgayit the following day on a contract until the summer of 2023.

Squad

Out on loan

Transfers

In

Loans in

Loans out

Released

Friendlies

Competitions

Overview

Premier League

Results summary

Results by round

Results

League table

Azerbaijan Cup

Squad statistics

Appearances and goals

|-
|colspan="14"|Players away on loan:
|-
|colspan="14"|Players who left Sabail during the season:

|}

Goal scorers

Clean sheets

Disciplinary record

References

Sabail FK
Azerbaijani football clubs 2021–22 season